Pseudomelina apicalis is a species of fly in the family Sciomyzidae.

References

Sciomyzidae
Insects described in 1933